Getting Personal is an American sitcom created by Jeff Greenstein and Jeff Strauss, that aired on Fox from April 6 to October 16, 1998.

Premise
A creative director at Old Dog Productions, an ad company in Chicago gets a new boss: the woman with whom he just had a disastrous date.

Cast
Vivica A. Fox as Robyn Buckley
Duane Martin as Milo Doucette
Jon Cryer as Sam Wagner
Elliott Gould as Jack Kacmarczyk
Nancy Cassaro as Shelly Tucci
Reggie Hayes as Leon Sykes Pettibone

Episodes

Season 1 (1998)

Season 2 (1998)

References

External links

1998 American television series debuts
1998 American television series endings
1990s American black sitcoms
1990s American sitcoms
1990s American workplace comedy television series
English-language television shows
Fox Broadcasting Company original programming
Television shows set in Chicago
Television series by 20th Century Fox Television